Home Video is the third studio album by American singer-songwriter Lucy Dacus. It was released on June 25, 2021, via Matador. It was promoted by the singles "Thumbs", "Hot & Heavy", "VBS", "Brando", and "Going Going Gone". The album received critical acclaim and placed on many critics' year-end lists.

Background 
In late February 2021, certain fans of Dacus received a VHS tape of a new song in the mail. On March 9, 2021, the song was released using the title "Thumbs". It had long been a staple of Dacus' live performances prior to its release. Dacus explained the way the song came about in a press release.
Home video footage is used in the album's music videos, as Dacus "wanted to visualize the moment when you first reflect on your childhood, which I think can also be the moment that childhood is over."

Promotion
Prior to the album's announcement, "Thumbs" was released as the lead single on March 9, 2021. On April 13, 2021, Dacus released the lead single for the album, "Hot & Heavy". The release of "Hot & Heavy" was accompanied by the album's official announcement. Dacus performed the song on The Late Show with Stephen Colbert. On May 19, 2021, Dacus released the album's third single, "VBS". "Brando" was released as the fourth single on June 8, 2021. The song was sent to adult alternative radio on June 14, 2021. Dacus promoted the album with a 28-city tour across North America in 2021. A shortened version of "Going Going Gone" was released as a single on August 7, 2021.

Critical reception

Home Video was met with widespread critical acclaim. At Metacritic, which assigns a normalized rating out of 100 to reviews from professional publications, the album received an average score of 85, based on 18 reviews.

Reviewing for AllMusic, Marcy Donelson wrote that, "With Dacus' warm vocals and melodies leading the way throughout, Home Video is an engrossing set steeped in life lessons and nostalgia." In Clash, Rebecca Sibley declared it "a powerful album" and "another exquisite offering from Lucy Dacus", while  Pitchforks Peyton Thomas appraised it as "a bold statement, a powerful post-adolescent text in its own right". Exclaim! reviewer Dylan Barnabe claimed that, "Dacus has long been heralded for her ability as a raconteur, and Home Video further cements this reputation. It is a deeply personal album filled with raw vignettes of young adulthood that claw at our collective consciousness." Writing for NME, Rhian Daly believed that, "for the most part, Dacus proves that looking back at your past might make you cringe, but there is beauty and value in those faltering, gawky days." Rolling Stone magazine's Angie Martoccio hailed the album as "her greatest work yet — a cohesive and poignant collection of tales from her teenage years in Richmond, Virginia", with stories "woven like a quilt, with several dark patches reminiscent of her hero Bruce Springsteen's The River". Jeremy Winograd shared similar praise in his review for Slant Magazine, saying that, "Ultimately, it's less the nuances of Dacus's writing than her willingness to expose herself and her past so freely—even the most difficult parts—that make the strongest impression on Home Video."

In June 2021, Home Video was listed as the 15th best album of the year so far by Stereogum and was included on a similar list by Slant.

Accolades

Track listing

Personnel

Performers

Lucy Dacus 
Dominic Angelella 
Liza Anne 
Drew Baker 
Julien Baker 
Beans 
Jacob Blizard 
Phoebe Bridgers 
Preston Cochran 
Keilan Creech 
Camille Faulkner 
Jake Finch 
Hadley Kennary 
Patrick Hyland 
Marin Leong 
Mitski 
Collin Pastore 
Scottie Prudhoe 
Ali Thibodeau 
Mackenzie Werner 
Harrison Whitford

Technical

Jacob Blizard – producer
Preston Cochran – engineer
Lucy Dacus – producer
Shawn Everett – mixing
Jake Finch – producer
Bob Ludwig – engineer
Collin Pastore – producer
Scottie Prudhoe – engineer

Charts

References 

2021 albums
Lucy Dacus albums
Matador Records albums
Pop albums by American artists